Oli Morris (born 19 August 1999) is an English-born, Irish-qualified rugby union player for United Rugby Championship and European Rugby Champions Cup side Munster. He plays primarily as a centre, though he can also play as a winger.

Career

Saracens
Morris' first professional club was Saracens, for whom he made two appearances in the Anglo-Welsh Cup as part of their youth setup. Whilst with Saracens, Morris was dual-registered with Ampthill and won National League 1 with the club during the 2018–19 season.

Worcester Warriors
Morris joined the Worcester Warriors academy ahead of the 2019–20, and signed his first senior contract with the club in February 2021. Worcester were placed into administration in September 2022.

Munster
Following Worcester's administration, Morris, who is Irish-qualified, joined United Rugby Championship club Munster on a contract until the end of the 2022–23 season.

International
Morris represented England under-18s, but is also Irish-qualified through a grandmother, and was selected in the Ireland under-20s squad for the 2019 Six Nations Under 20s Championship, playing in friendlies for Leinster and Munster development teams against the under-20s in the build-up to the tournament.

References

External links
Worcester Warriors Profile
All Rugby Profile
Munster Profile

Living people
1999 births
Rugby union players from Chelmsford
English rugby union players
Saracens F.C. players
Ampthill RUFC players
Worcester Warriors players
Munster Rugby players
English expatriate rugby union players
Expatriate rugby union players in Ireland
English expatriate sportspeople in Ireland
Rugby union centres
Rugby union wings